is a Japanese decathlete. He competed in the men's decathlon at the 1964 Summer Olympics.

References

1936 births
Living people
People from Hamamatsu
Sportspeople from Shizuoka Prefecture
Japanese decathletes
Olympic decathletes
Olympic athletes of Japan
Athletes (track and field) at the 1964 Summer Olympics
Asian Games silver medalists for Japan
Asian Games bronze medalists for Japan
Asian Games medalists in athletics (track and field)
Athletes (track and field) at the 1958 Asian Games
Athletes (track and field) at the 1962 Asian Games
Medalists at the 1958 Asian Games
Medalists at the 1962 Asian Games
Japan Championships in Athletics winners